The Interlyga is an independent baseball league based in the Baltic states. Previously clubs from Belarus, Finland, Latvia and Russia were also competing in the Interlyga.

2020

The 2020 Interlyga had been planned firstly to be competed between teams from Estonia, Lithuania and Russia, and later as 4 team competition between 2 teams from Lithuania - BK Vilnius and Kaunas ABK, Estonian champions Kiili Panthers and Latvian champions. However, Latvian team was replaced by BK Titanai Utena before the season started. The competition consisted of two rounds, first played in Tallinn, Estonia, and second in Utena Hippodrome, Utena, Lithuania, which also later hosted the finals. The Estonian team had to skip the final due to a COVID-19 outbreak in the squad.

Kaunas ABK beat BK Vilnius 4–1 in the Grand Final, with home run by Will Gordon being the decider. Titanai won over replacements Titanai-2 16:3 in the match for bronze medals.

2014
BK Vilnius were the champions of the 2014 Interlyga.

Divisions
Northern group:
 BK Riga (LAT)
 Kiili Panthers (EST)
 North Stars St. Petersburg (RUS)

Central (Lithuania) group:
 Kaunas Lituanica
 Vilnius Juodasis Vikingas - Sporto Vilkai
 Utena Vėtra
 BK Vilnius

Southern (Belarus) group:
 BC Minsk
 Zubry Brest
 Sugar Storm Skidel

References

Baseball leagues in Europe
Baseball competitions in Lithuania
Baseball in Belarus
Baseball in Estonia
Baseball in Finland
Baseball in Latvia
Baseball in Russia
Sports leagues established in 2003